Pingaleswar is a village in Kamrup, situated in north Brahmaputra bank.

Transport
Pingaleswar  is accessible through National Highway 31. All major private commercial vehicles ply between Pingaleswar and nearest towns Baihta Chariali.

Visit: Pingaleswar is famous for the Siva Mandir Pingaleswar Siva Dewalaya. Pingaleswar dewalaya.

See also
 Guakuchi
 Ramdia

References

Villages in Kamrup district